Conayca District is one of nineteen districts of the province Huancavelica in Peru.

See also 
 Llaqta Qulluy (Conayca)

References